Parodiodoxa is a genus of flowering plants belonging to the family Brassicaceae. It just contains one species, Parodiodoxa chionophila (Speg.) O.E.Schulz 

Its native range is northwestern Argentina.

The genus name of Parodiodoxa is in honour of Lorenzo Raimundo Parodi (1895–1966), an Argentinian botanist and agricultural engineer, professor of botany in Buenos Aires and La Plata, with a focus on South American grasses. The Latin specific epithet of chionophila means snow lover. Both the genus and the species were first described and published in Notizbl. Bot. Gart. Berlin-Dahlem Vol.10 on pages 781-783 in 1929.

References

Brassicaceae
Brassicaceae genera
Plants described in 1929
Flora of Northwest Argentina